John Pasquin (born November 30, 1944) is an American director of film, television and theatre.

Career
An alumnus of Beloit College and Carnegie Mellon University, Pasquin began directing Broadway theatre plays in the early 1980s. He moved on to television, directing episodes of the series Family Ties, Growing Pains, Alice and Newhart. In addition to directing a season 1 episode of Roseanne, he directed the entire second season, as well as the first four episodes from the revived tenth season. His producing debut came in 1991 with the sitcom Home Improvement starring Tim Allen, also directing a number of episodes of the series. He also directed Allen in the films The Santa Clause (1994), also his feature film directing debut, Jungle 2 Jungle (1997) and Joe Somebody (2001). In 2005, he directed Miss Congeniality 2: Armed and Fabulous, the sequel to the 2000 film Miss Congeniality.

Pasquin's other television directing credits include Thirtysomething, L.A. Law, George Lopez, Freddie, Accidentally on Purpose, Rules of Engagement and Better with You. In 2011, he worked with Tim Allen again, directing and producing the sitcom Last Man Standing.

Personal life
Pasquin is married to actress JoBeth Williams; they have two children, Will and Nick. He also has a daughter, Sarah, from a previous marriage.

Filmography

Film

Television

Accolades

References

External links

1944 births
Living people
American film directors
American television directors
American television producers
American theatre directors
Beloit College alumni
Carnegie Mellon University College of Fine Arts alumni
Comedy film directors
Place of birth missing (living people)